FramesDirect.com is an international online eyewear retailer. The company sells eyewear products such as eyeglasses, prescription sunglasses, sunglasses, and contact lenses through its website. FramesDirect.com sells designer and brand name eyewear products with over 60,000 models displayed on its website. Founded in 1996, FramesDirect.com was one of the earliest online optical retail stores.

Company history
Co-founders Dhavid Cooper, OD and Guy Hodgson, OD are both originally from South Africa where they moved from to the United States in the 1980s. The two business partners had several optometry practices in Houston, Texas operating from 1986 until 1994 when they had an opportunity to sell their offices. After taking a year off, the two co-founded FramesDirect in 1996 and launched FramesDirect.com later that year. The company was headquartered in Houston until Hurricane Rita and Hurricane Ike forced their customer service representatives to relocate to Austin, Texas, and eventually the rest of the office followed. In 2010, Essilor, a prescription lens manufacturing company, acquired the majority stake in FramesDirect.com. Shortly after, Essilor partnered with FramesDirect.com to create and launch MyOpticalOnline.com, an online service that allows independent eyewear practices to sell their products online.

The company has been recognized by the MassMutual Financial Group and U.S. Chamber of Commerce with a Blue Chip Enterprise Award, and in 2000, FramesDirect.com was a finalist for the Ernst & Young Entrepreneur of the Year award.

Operations
FramesDirect.com sells over 250 brand name frames such as Ray-Ban or Oakley, which consumers can search for and purchase on their own at any time on the company's website. Consumers can purchase frames, prescription eyeglasses, prescription or plain sunglasses, and contact lens refills. After choosing the desired frames, the consumer goes through a three-step process to order lenses including choosing the lens type, lens thickness, and optional enhancement features. FramesDirect.com has a customer service team staffed by opticians that are available on the phone or over online chat.

Armed Forces Eyewear
Armed Forces Eyewear (AFEyewear) is a division of FramesDirect.com that provides additional discounts to military personnel and their families, the national guard, reserve members, veterans, and first responders. AFEyewear uses the customer's name and birth date to verify his or her active or former military status and then offers eyewear products with a 30 percent discount off the listed retail price.

References

Eyewear companies of the United States
American companies established in 1996
Retail companies established in 1996
Eyewear retailers of the United States